Dieter Stauder (born 1940) is a German attorney-at-law and an expert in intellectual property law. He was Director of the International Section of the Centre for International Industrial Property Studies ( or CEIPI), which is part of the University of Strasbourg, France, from 1992 to 2007. From 1992 to 2005, he was member of the European Patent Office. He also worked as an attorney-at-law with the firm Bardehle Pagenberg Dost Altenburg Geissler.

He coauthored the 1200-page book "Singer/Stauder, The European Patent Convention, A Commentary, 2003", considered as an international reference book on the European Patent Convention. He has published at least 100 academic papers.

Bibliography 
 Singer/Stauder, The European Patent Convention. A Commentary, edited by Margarete Singer and Dieter Stauder, Carl Heymanns Verlag KG, Munich 2003. (sample in pdf)

References

External links
  at the European Intellectual Property Institutes Network (EIPIN)

1940 births
Living people
20th-century German lawyers
Patent law scholars
21st-century German lawyers